Aletta E. "Alta" Schutte is a South African hypertension and heart disease specialist, who is Principal Theme Lead of Cardiac, Vascular and Metabolic Medicine in the University of New South Wales in Sydney, Australia with a joint appointment as Professorial Fellow at the George Institute for Global Health.  She was the Director of Hypertension in Africa Research Team and Director of the Medical Research Council Extramural Unit for Hypertension and Cardiovascular Disease at the North-West University in South Africa. She has fulfilled several leadership roles, including the President of the Southern African Hypertension Society, and President of the International Society of Hypertension.

She did her Doctorate in Potchefstroom University for Christian Higher Education in Cardiovascular Physiology.

Career and Research 
When Schutte took on her former role where she was the South African Research Chair in the Early Detection and Prevention of Cardiovascular Disease in Africa, her primary focus point for her research was to detect early markers for the growth of hypertension and inhibit cardiovascular disease in the African community.

References

External links 

 

Living people
Year of birth missing (living people)
Academic staff of the University of New South Wales
South African women scientists
21st-century South African women scientists
South African medical researchers
North-West University alumni